Chapman House can refer to:
(sorted by state, then city/town)

 Withers-Chapman House, Huntsville, Alabama, listed on the National Register of Historic Places (NRHP)
 John G. Chapman House, Arcata, California, listed on the NRHP in Humboldt County
 A. H. Chapman House, Chico, California, NRHP-listed
 David Chapman Farmstead, Ledyard, Connecticut, listed on the NRHP in New London County
 Taylor Chapman House, Windsor, Connecticut, listed on the NRHP in Hartford County
 Chapman-Steed House, Crawfordville, Georgia, listed on the NRHP in Taliaferro County
Hunt House (Griffin, Georgia), also known as the Chapman-Kincaid-Hunt House, NRHP-listed in Spalding County
 John Chapman Plantation, Jeffersonville, Georgia, listed on the NRHP in Twiggs County
 Chapman-Noble House, Wichita, Kansas, listed on the NRHP in Sedgwick County
 Chapman-Hall House, Damariscotta, Maine, listed on the NRHP in Lincoln County
 Leonard Bond Chapman House, Portland, Maine, listed on the NRHP in Cumberland County
 Charles Chapman House, Mankato, Minnesota, listed on the NRHP in Blue Earth County
 J. M. Chapman House, Montclair, New Jersey, NRHP-listed
 Chapman Farmhouse, Duanesburg, New York, NRHP-listed
 Sutton-Chapman-Howland House, Newark Valley, New York, NRHP-listed
 Chapman House (Syracuse, New York), NRHP-listed
 A. F. Chapman House, Watkins Glen, New York, NRHP-listed
 Chapman House (Nova Scotia), a National Historic Site of Canada
 Chapman-Hutchinson House, Dublin, Ohio, listed on the NRHP in Franklin County
 John A. Chapman House, Wellington, Ohio, listed on the NRHP in Lorain County
 John Chapman House (also known as London Purchase Farm), New Hope, Pennsylvania, listed on the NRHP in Bucks County
 Chapman House (Austin, Texas), listed on the NRHP in Travis County
 Oscar H. Chapman House, Waxahachie, Texas, listed on the NRHP in Ellis County